The Isfahan School is a school of Islamic philosophy. It was founded by Mir Damad and reached its fullest development in the work of Mulla Sadra. The name was coined by Seyyed Hossein Nasr and Henry Corbin.

Because of the attention of Shah Abbas during the Safavid Dynasty in Iran to intellectual tradition in Islam, Isfahan became a famous academic city and the intellectual center of Iran at the time, along with the cities of Rey and Shiraz.

Historical context
This school of thought began to develop once Iran was economically and politically stable. The Safavid court also provided funding for the arts, which also contributed to the development. At the time, there were many disputes between Shiite scholars, such as Ahamad Alavi, and Christian and Jewish scholars. In this period the intellectual life of Suhrevardi was revived by Mir Damad and Mulla Sadra. According to Seyyed Hosein Nasr, this school of thought plays an important role both in terms of the relation between philosophy and prophecy, and in the training of Mulla Sadra. The school of Isfahan is a subsidiary of the Shiraz school of philosophy. Several philosophers that were not part of the Shiraz school of thought had very important roles in preparing the Isfahan school, such as Ibn Turkah, Qadi Maybudi and Ibn Abi Jomhour Ahsaei. The group of founders then announced Shia as formal religion in Persia, in an attempt to unify the entire country, with Isfahan as their capital.

Founder

Mir Damad founded the Isfahan philosophical school. He was the nephew of Muhaqiq Karaki, an important Shia scholar who had influence in the Shia jurisprudence. Some consider him familiar with philosophical prophecy as a result to the problem of Time. Corbin describes Mir Damad as having an analytic mind and aware of religious foundation of knowledge. Perhaps the most important characteristic of Mira Damad's philosophy is a synthesis between Avicennism and Averroism, or his synthesis is between the intellectual and the spiritual. Mir Damad's theory on Time is as popular as Huduth Dahri's, though Damad's philosophical opinion is criticized by Huduth's pupil, Mulla Sadra. Historically, there was great strife between Mulla Sadra and Mir Damad, as a result of the differences of their philosophical theories on subjects such as time.

Other teachers

Mir Fendereski

Mir Abul Qasim Findiriski was a peripatetic philosopher and follower of Farabi and Avicenna. He was a Peripatetic, as opposed to the illuminationists. As a scholar, he taught several scientific subjects in the Isfahan school, such as mathematics and medicine. it is debated whether or not Mulla Sadra studied under him, though the two worked together extensivally. Mir Findiriski also studied other religions, such as Zoroastrianism and Hindi. He also wrote several works on Indian philosophy, a series of treatises on the fine arts, and one on his mystical experiences. According to Nasr, he was well-versed in different philosophies, poetry, alchemy, and the philosophy of Yoga. Mir Findiriski collaborated with Mir Damad to write the Treatise of Sanaiyyah, attempting to link philosophy and prophecy. Mir Findiriski also attempted to translate several Indian philosophical works into Persian.

Shaykh-i Baha’i

Shaykh-i Baha’i was one of the three masters of Mulla Sadra, worked in the Isfahan school, and served as chief jurist on the Safavid Court. Like many Islamic scholars of the era, he was both a scientist and a man of wisdom; like Mir Damad and Mir Fenedereski, he was skilled in several sciences. At the time, he attempted to harmonize the relationship between Shariah and Tariqah. He coined the term Hikmate Yamani (wisdom of believing.) He believed that humans were the only being capable of intelligence in a philosophy called "The Place of Illumination for Existence".

Philosophers of Mir Damad's School
 Sayyed Ahmad Alavi
 Shams Addin Muhammad Gilani
 Abd al-Razzaq Lahiji
 Qutb Addin Muhammad Eshkevari

Philosophers of Shaykh-i Baha’i's School
 Mulla Sadra
 Mohsen Fayz Kashani
 Mirza Rafiaa Naeini

Philosophers of Mir Finidiriski's School
 Agha Hosein khansari
 Muhammad Baqir Sabzevari

Philosophers of Rajab Ali Tabrizi's school
 Qazi Saeed Qomi
 Mir Qavam Addin Razi
 Muhammad Sadiq Ardestani

Other philosophers of Isfahan School
 Mulla Muhammad Sadiq Ardestan
 Muhammad Ismaeil Khajouei
 Molla Naima Taleghani
 Abdu Al Rahim Damavandi
 Agha Muhammad Bid Abadi
 Mulla Mahdi Naraqi
 Mulla Ali Nuri
 Mulla Nazar Ali gilani
 Molla Esmaeel Isfahani
 Molla Abdollah Zonuzi
 Molla hadi Sabzevari
 Molla Muhammad Esmaeel Darb Koushki
 Molla Muhammad kashani
 Jahangir khan Qashqaei

References

Sources
 Andrew J. Newman, Safavid Iran: Rebirth of a Persian Empire, Issue 5 of Library of Middle East History, Publisher I.B.Tauris, 2006, 9781860646676
 Rula Jurdi Abisaab, Converting Persia: Religion and Power in the Safavid Empire, Volume 1 of International Library of Iranian Studies, I.B.Tauris, 2004, 186064970X, 9781860649707
 Roger Savory, Iran Under the Safavids, Cambridge University Press, 2007, 0521042518, 9780521042512

Further reading
 
 Encyclopædia Iranica: Isfahan School of Philosophy.

Islamic philosophical schools
Philosophical schools and traditions
Persian philosophy
Safavid Iran
Iranian philosophy